Mostafa El Gamal (born January 1, 1997) is an Egyptian professional footballer who plays as a central midfielder for the Egyptian club El-Entag El-Harby. In 2017, El Gamal signed a 5-year contract for El-Entag in a free transfer from Al-Ahly. Before El Gamal transfer to El-Entag, Al-Ahly had turned down several loaning offers from clubs like El Sharkia, Raja, and Al Ittihad Alexandria, which was controversial to leave the player at the end.

References

External links
Mostafa El Gamal at KOOORA.com

Living people
1997 births
Egyptian footballers
Egyptian Premier League players
Association football midfielders
El Entag El Harby SC players